Snoopy is an anthropomorphic beagle in the comic strip Peanuts by Charles M. Schulz. He can also be found in all of the Peanuts films and television specials. Since his debut on October 4, 1950, Snoopy has become one of the most recognizable and iconic characters in the comic strip and is considered more famous than Charlie Brown in some countries. The original drawings of Snoopy were inspired by Spike, one of Schulz's childhood dogs.

Traits
Snoopy is a loyal, imaginative, and good-natured beagle who is prone to imagining fantasy lives, including being an author, a college student known as "Joe Cool", an attorney, and a World War I flying ace. He is perhaps best known in this last persona, wearing an aviator's helmet and goggles and a scarf while carrying a swagger stick (like a stereotypical British Army officer of World War I and II).

Snoopy can be selfish, gluttonous and lazy at times, and occasionally mocks his owner, Charlie Brown. But on the whole, he shows great love, care, and loyalty for his owner (even though he cannot even remember his name and always refers to him as "the round-headed kid"). In the 1990s comic strips, he is obsessed with cookies, particularly the chocolate-chip variety. This, and other instances in which he indulges in large chocolate-based meals and snacks, shows resistance to theobromine unheard of in other dogs.

All of his fantasies have a similar formula. Snoopy pretends to be something, usually "world famous", and fails. His short "novels" are never published. His Sopwith Camel is consistently shot down by his imaginary rival enemy, the German flying ace the "Red Baron". Schulz said of Snoopy's character in a 1997 interview: "He has to retreat into his fanciful world in order to survive. Otherwise, he leads kind of a dull, miserable life. I don't envy dogs the lives they have to live."

Snoopy imagines himself to speak, but never actually does, other than nonverbal sounds and occasionally uttering "Woof". His very articulate thoughts are shown in thought balloons. In the animated Peanuts films and television specials, Snoopy's thoughts are not verbalized. His moods are instead conveyed through moans, yelps, growls, sobs, laughter, and monosyllabic utterances such as "bleah" or "hey" as well as through pantomime. His vocal effects were usually provided by Bill Melendez, who first played the role during Snoopy's appearances on The Tennessee Ernie Ford Show. The only exceptions are in the animated adaptions of the musicals You're a Good Man, Charlie Brown and Snoopy!!! The Musical, in which Snoopy's thoughts are verbalized by Robert Towers and Cameron Clarke, respectively. (His dialogue, however, is not "heard" by the other characters except Woodstock the bird and other non-human characters; however, he does remember Charlie Brown's name.)

Snoopy's doghouse defies physics and is shown to be bigger on the inside than the outside.

History

Snoopy appeared on October 4, 1950, two days after the first Peanuts strip. He was one of the four original characters, along with Charlie Brown, Patty, and Shermy. He was called Snoopy for the first time in the November 10 strip.

On March 16, 1952, his thoughts were first shown in a thought balloon.  Snoopy first appeared upright on his hind legs on January 9, 1956, when he was shown sliding across a sheet of ice after Shermy and Lucy had first done so. He is first shown sleeping on top of his doghouse rather than inside it on December 12, 1958, and first adopts his World War I Flying Ace persona on October 10, 1965. Snoopy's final appearance in the comic was on February 13, 2000, when he was shown sitting on top of his doghouse typing Schulz's farewell message to his readers.

Popularity
Snoopy appeared as a character balloon in the Macy's Thanksgiving Day Parade in 1968; the balloon depicted Snoopy in his World War I Flying Ace costume. The beagle has been in almost every parade ever since in different costumes, as an ice skater, a jester (to celebrate the new millennium and the parade's 75th anniversary), and an astronaut.

Relationship with other Peanuts characters

Charlie Brown 

Despite his history of conflicted loyalties, his constant disrespect for Charlie Brown, and his inability to remember his name (he refers to him as "that round-headed kid"), Snoopy has shown both love and loyalty to his owner. He joins Charlie Brown in walking out of a game of Ha-Ha Herman when Peppermint Patty insults Charlie Brown, unaware that Charlie Brown is within earshot. He also helps Charlie Brown recover his autographed baseball when a bully takes it and challenges Charlie Brown to fight him for it. When Charlie Brown has to stop dedicating himself to making Snoopy happy, Snoopy replies, "Don't worry about it. I was already happy." In The Peanuts Movie, Snoopy remains loyal to Charlie Brown, supporting and caring for him throughout the movie.

In early Peanuts strips, Charlie Brown was not Snoopy's owner (as seen in the February 2, 1951, strip), and it was not made clear who, if anyone, his actual owner was. At various times, it was suggested that he was Patty's or Shermy's dog.  Charlie Brown was first portrayed as being responsible for Snoopy in the strips of November 1 and 3, 1955; it was not until September 1, 1958, that Snoopy was specifically said to be Charlie Brown's dog. (In the September 20, 1980, strip, Charlie Brown comments that he once told Snoopy to "stay" and "he never went home.")

In both the early strips and the movie Snoopy, Come Home, Charlie Brown says that he got Snoopy after being bullied by another kid. His parents took him to the Daisy Hill Puppy Farm to cheer him up, where he met and bought Snoopy. The special Snoopy's Reunion depicts their first meeting.

Lucy 

Snoopy frequently tries to kiss Lucy on the cheek and/or nose, which Lucy, who is afraid of dog germs, thoroughly hates. Despite her distaste of doggy kisses, Lucy seems to care for Snoopy: in Snoopy, Come Home, Lucy is sad to see him go and is (momentarily) glad when he comes back home. In some strips, Lucy goes to Snoopy for help, such as in the April 16, 1961 strip, wherein a jealous Lucy and Frieda are beating each other up at Schroeder's piano, Lucy ends up winning, and shakes hands with Snoopy in the end, looking slightly injured. Snoopy also commandeers Lucy's psychiatric booth either in her absence or when she ends up being the one needing help. In Snoopy!, Lucy and Snoopy hug each other during the song “If Just One Person”.

Linus 

Snoopy often tries to steal Linus's blanket, leading to slapstick fights and wild chases, the latter of which usually involve Snoopy running up, grabbing the blanket in his mouth, then running off with Linus holding on for dear life, and finally swinging Linus and the blanket around and around in a circular motion through the air before letting go and they both fly off to who-knows-where.

Lila 
Lila was Snoopy's owner before Charlie Brown. Snoopy visits her in the cartoon Snoopy, Come Home and struggles to decide whether to stay with Charlie Brown or go back to Lila. Lila quickly persuades him to leave Charlie Brown so Snoopy can live with her again. However, upon arriving at her apartment complex, Snoopy is very relieved to see a "NO DOGS ALLOWED" sign and returns to live with Charlie Brown.

Peppermint Patty 

Peppermint Patty often refers to Snoopy as a "funny-looking kid with a big nose", unaware that he is a beagle. In one instance, she has him serve as her attorney in a case involving the school dress code. In the March 21, 1974, strip, Marcie tells Peppermint Patty that Snoopy is a beagle, finally resulting in her realizing his true identity. Snoopy serves as Peppermint Patty's watchdog several times. She is one of the few girls who does not get disgusted after being kissed by him.

Sally Brown 

Like Lucy, Sally does not care that much for Snoopy and often calls him a stupid beagle. Sally usually complains when her big brother asks her to feed Snoopy whenever he is away from home. While she is still an infant, Sally has a friendly and playful relationship with Snoopy. In later years, Sally occasionally enlists Snoopy's help in school assignments. She even treats him to an ice cream cone (a very tall ice cream cone, with scoops of about a dozen flavors) when Snoopy helps her get an "A" on a report about "Our Animal Friends". In one storyline, Sally uses Snoopy as a "weapon" to help protect her from bullies on the playground (Snoopy barks loudly at anyone who threatens Sally, leading Snoopy to comment, "I feel like a can of mace!"), but this ends in disaster when Snoopy sees an old girlfriend of his and runs off to meet her, abandoning Sally and leaving her to get "slaughtered" by the playground bullies.

Schroeder 

Schroeder does not mind much when Snoopy sits against his toy piano, except when Snoopy dances on top of the piano, much to Schroeder's annoyance. He also sometimes plays with the notes coming from the piano.

Rerun van Pelt 

Rerun, the youngest child character in the strip, plays with Snoopy sometimes. In some strips, Rerun and Snoopy are playing cards with each other, both of them clueless about the rules.

Woodstock 

Woodstock is Snoopy's best friend and sidekick. He is a small, yellow bird of indeterminate species. He speaks in a chirping language that only Snoopy and his other bird friends can understand. In return, the birds somehow understand Snoopy's thoughts. In some strips, Snoopy can be seen telling a joke to Woodstock and both laugh so hard they end up falling off the doghouse. Woodstock sometimes sleeps on top of Snoopy's nose, such as in one strip where Snoopy says "Never share your pad with a restless bird".

Fifi 
Fifi is a major love interest of Snoopy and she appears in Life Is a Circus, Charlie Brown and The Peanuts Movie. In Life Is a Circus, Charlie Brown, Snoopy sees Fifi, a white poodle, at a circus and starts to get attracted to her. He and Fifi do a trapeze act and afterward, he runs away, taking Fifi with him. Fifi decides to go back to the circus, however, leaving Snoopy heartbroken and forced to return to Charlie Brown. In The Peanuts Movie, Fifi (voiced by Kristin Chenoweth) is a pilot just like Snoopy (being redesigned to be bipedal while still retaining her poodle traits), and together they have interaction via Snoopy's typewriter against the Red Baron. He shows how much he cares for her when he cries at Schroeder's house after she is captured by the Red Baron. Snoopy, Woodstock, and the Beagle Scouts set out on a mission to save her. Eventually, they save her, and she shows her affection to Snoopy.

Siblings

In the comic strip, Snoopy has seven brothers and sisters. Five appeared at various times in the strip: four brothers, Spike, Andy, Marbles, and Olaf; and one sister, Belle. The two others were never mentioned by name in the comic strip, but the whole family appeared in 1991 television special Snoopy's Reunion, introducing the two unknown siblings, identified in the special as Molly and Rover.

Snoopy having seven siblings was an element of the strip that developed as the strip evolved. Originally described in a June 1959 strip as an "only dog", Snoopy went to a family reunion with several unnamed siblings in a May 1965 sequence, stating that they all spoke different languages and couldn't understand each other. In March 1970, Snoopy wrote in his autobiography that he was one of seven puppies, and the number reached its final count of eight beagles in December 1972.

In a 1987 interview, Schulz said that he felt introducing Snoopy's siblings was a mistake, similar to the introduction of Eugene the Jeep in Thimble Theatre: "I think Eugene the Jeep took the life out of Popeye himself, and I'm sure Segar didn't realize that. I realized it myself a couple of years ago when I began to introduce Snoopy's brothers and sisters. I realized that when I put Belle and Marbles in there it destroyed the relationship that Snoopy has with the kids, which is a very strange relationship. And these things are so subtle when you're doing them, you can make mistakes and not realize them." Schulz elaborated further in another 1987 interview: "Snoopy had a sister, Belle, whom I discovered I really didn't like. I brought in Spike and I like Spike a lot. But when I brought another brother in — I thought Marbles would make a great name for a dog — I discovered almost immediately that bringing in other animals took the uniqueness away from Snoopy. So the only other animal character who works now is Spike, as long as Spike stays out in the desert."

Olaf is often referred to as "Ugly Olaf."  The name Olaf is part of Minnesota's heritage. Schulz grew up in Minnesota.

Spike

Spike, Snoopy's older brother who lived in the desert, was the most frequently seen sibling in the strip. He was introduced in the August 13, 1975, strip. He was a recurring character between 1984 and 1988, and was also used in one-off appearances sporadically through the rest of Peanuts history. Spike is named after Charles Schulz's childhood dog.

Spike's appearance is similar to Snoopy's, but he is substantially thinner, has a perpetually sleepy-eyed look, sports long, droopy whiskers that look like a mustache, and wears a fedora. He is called Snoopy's older brother during the first story in which he appears. Spike lives in the middle of a desert near Needles, California, mostly interacting with inanimate saguaro cacti and rocks.

He temporarily became Rerun's dog in I Want a Dog for Christmas, Charlie Brown, and also starred in his own television special, It's the Girl in the Red Truck, Charlie Brown. He was also a main character in Snoopy's Getting Married, Charlie Brown, where he is shown traveling from Needles to visit Snoopy to be the best beagle at his wedding.

A large statue of Spike resides inside the Needles Regional Museum in Needles, California. The Schulz family lived in Needles from 1928 to 1930.

Belle
Belle is Snoopy's sister, who first appeared in the strip on June 28, 1976. She lives in Kansas City, Missouri with her teenage son, whom Snoopy noted as resembling the Pink Panther. Belle herself bears a strong resemblance to Snoopy, but with longer eyelashes. In addition, she wears a lace collar and sometimes wears a pearl necklace.

Belle only made a few appearances in the strip but is remembered because of the Belle stuffed animal toys sold in the late 1970s and early 1980s. San Francisco toy merchandiser Determined Productions had the license to make Snoopy plush toys, and they introduced Belle plush after receiving many requests from children who wanted a female "sister" doll.

In 1984, Snoopy and Belle inspired fashion designers around the world, including Lagerfeld, Armani, and de la Renta, to create one-of-a-kind outfits in their honor. Both beagles modeled for the "Snoopy in Fashion" exhibition held that year in Japan. "Snoopy & Belle in Fashion" continues to be exhibited . Photographs of the exhibition were collected in a 1988 book, Snoopy in Fashion.

There was another traveling exhibition of Snoopy and Belle plush in outfits made by fashion designers in 1990, as a celebration of the comic strip's fortieth anniversary. This exhibition began in Paris at the Louvre Museum, and then to the Mitsukoshi department store in Tokyo, followed by showings in Los Angeles, New York City, London, Milan and Madrid. Photographs from this collection were published as Snoopy Around the World.

Reception 

Snoopy and Charlie Brown were ranked by TV Guide as the 8th greatest cartoon characters of all time.

Some critics feel that the strip suffered a decline in quality after the 1960s. Writing in 2000, Christopher Caldwell argued that the character of Snoopy, and the strip's increased focus on him in the 1970s, "went from being the strip's besetting artistic weakness to ruining it altogether". Caldwell felt that Snoopy "was never a full participant in the tangle of relationships that drove Peanuts in its Golden Age", as he could not talk. He went on to say that Snoopy "was way too shallow for the strip as it developed in the 1960s, and the strips he featured in were anomalies."

Jim Davis noted that Snoopy was a boon from a marketing standpoint, which inspired him to center his comic strip Garfield around a cat: "Snoopy is very popular in licensing. Charlie Brown is not."

A toy called The Snoopy Snowcone Machine was popular in the '80s and was later recreated in the 2010s by Cra-z-art.

Awards and honors 

Schulz was a keen bridge player, and Peanuts occasionally included bridge references. In 1997 the American Contract Bridge League (ACBL) awarded both Snoopy and Woodstock the honorary rank of Life Master, and Schulz was delighted.

On November 2, 2015, Snoopy was honored with a star on the Hollywood Walk of Fame, becoming the second Peanuts-related figure to be inducted with a star, after Schulz.

In aviation and space

 Following the Apollo 1 fire, Snoopy became the official mascot of aerospace safety, testing and the rebuilding of the Apollo Program.
 The Apollo 10 lunar module was named Snoopy and the command module Charlie Brown. While not included in the official mission logo, Charlie Brown and Snoopy became semi-official mascots for the mission, as seen here and here.  Schulz also drew some special mission-related artwork for NASA,  and several regular strips related to the mission, one showing Snoopy en route to the Moon atop his doghouse with a fishbowl on his head for a helmet. "We have mentioned," wrote television producer Lee Mendelson, "that Charles Schulz is a gambler, a man who doesn't sit pat on success. The New York Times headlined: 'Creator of Peanuts Tempts Fate on Apollo Mission.' Certainly, if a tragedy had occurred, as well it might have, the symbols would forever remain in man's mind as symbols of disaster. But Sparky has always had faith in the Apollo program, from the very start, and he felt if those men could risk their lives, the least he could do would be to risk the popularity of the characters." The strip that ran on July 21, 1969 – one day after Neil Armstrong and Buzz Aldrin landed the Apollo 11 Lunar Module Eagle on the Moon – included a full Moon in the background, with a black mark on it representing the module.
 The fabric cap worn by NASA astronauts as part of the Extravehicular Mobility Unit is known as a "Snoopy cap", a reference to how the white crown and black earflaps of the cap resemble Snoopy's fur and ears.
 The Silver Snoopy award is a special NASA honor, in the form of a sterling silver pin with an engraving of Snoopy in a spacesuit helmet. It is given by an astronaut to someone who works in the space program that has gone above and beyond in pursuit of quality and safety.
 Snoopy is the name of a United States Air Force B-58 Hustler bomber, serial number 55-0665, which was modified to test a radar system.
 American insurance company MetLife used Snoopy as their corporate mascot between 1985 and 2016. Snoopy One, Snoopy Two, and Snoopy J are three airships owned and operated by MetLife that provide aerial coverage of sporting events, and feature Snoopy as the World War I flying ace on their fuselage. As of October 20, 2016, MetLife no longer features Snoopy in its commercials, due to a global rebranding.
 The Charles M. Schulz–Sonoma County Airport in California, named after Schulz, has a logo featuring Snoopy in his World War I flying ace attire flying atop his doghouse.
 Snoopy is the mascot of the 26th Squadron (Barons, pronounced Barones) of the United States Air Force Academy, appearing on their squadron patch.
 Snoopy and NASA announced, in April 2019, that Snoopy will return to the Moon aboard NASA Orion in 2024. He will also be the gravity indicator aboard Artemis 1.
In November 2019, Apple TV made a "Snoopy in Space" series.

References

External links

Snoopy’s quote was so deep (Part 1) 
 The complete text of Snoopy's It Was a Dark and Stormy Night
10 Facts About Linus Van Pelt (“Peanuts”)

Peanuts characters
Fictional anthropomorphic characters
Fictional baseball players
Comics characters introduced in 1950
Anthropomorphic dogs
Fictional writers
Fictional contract bridge players
Fictional aviators
Male characters in animation
Male characters in comics